The Oklahoma State Cowgirls softball team represents Oklahoma State University–Stillwater in NCAA Division I college softball.  The team participates in the Big 12 Conference. The Cowgirls are currently led by head coach Kenny Gajewski. The team plays its home games at Cowgirl Stadium located on the university's campus.

History

Coaching history

Championships

Conference championships

Conference tournament championships

Coaching staff

Notable players
Sources:

Conference awards
Big 12 Player of the Year
Lauren Bay, 2003
Vanessa Shippy, 2016, 2018

Big 12 Pitcher of the Year
Carrie Eberle, 2021
Kelly Maxwell, 2022

Big 12 Freshman of the Year
Jaime Foutch, 1996

Big 12 Newcomer of the Year
Leanne Tyler, 1996
Shelly Graham, 1999

Big 12 Scholar-Athlete of the Year
Vanessa Shippy, 2017, 2018

References